This is a list of organizations that promote, advocate, or otherwise affiliate with youth empowerment. This is an incomplete list which can or may never satisfy any objective standard for completeness.

A
 Adventures of the Mind
 American Youth Congress
 Americans for a Society Free from Age Restrictions
 AIESEC
 Aspiring Asia
 Article 12

B
 Black United Front of Nova Scotia
 British Youth Council
 Blooming Education

C
 Catch21
 Children and Youth International
 Civil Society Leadership Institute
 Community High School (Ann Arbor, Michigan)

D
 District Fellows
 Center for Discipline and Intelligence Leadership Initiative
 DECA

E 
Elevate (organization)
European Youth Parliament

F
 Freechild Institute for Youth Engagement
 Funky Dragon

G
 Girls, Inc.
 Global Youth Action Network
 Go Grrrls

H
 Heirs To Our Oceans

I
 International Coordination Meeting of Youth Organisations
 International Federation of Liberal Youth
 International Youth Rights

J
 Junior Chamber International

M
 Midstory
 Millennium Kids
 MEChA

N
 National Youth Leadership Council
 National Youth Rights Association
 Northern Ireland Youth Forum
 Northumberland Youth Advisory Council
 Not Back to School Camp

O
Oaktree

P
 Palestinian Youth Association for Leadership and Rights Activation
 Panafrican Youth Union
 Paulo Freire Freedom School
 Peacefire
 Poplar HARCA

R
 Reality Check NY
Rotaract

S
 Sano Sansar Initiative
 SEALNet
 Scottish Youth Parliament
 Sierra Youth Coalition / Coalition Jeunesse Sierra
 Student Nonviolent Coordinating Committee
 Students for Sensible Drug Policy
 Students for a Democratic Society
 Sangguniang Kabataan

T
 Tzivos Hashem
 Taking Children Seriously
 Ten Sing
The Youth Cafe

U
 UK Youth Parliament

V
 4T - Vietnam Youth Education Support Center (Vietnam)

W
 World Changers Academy
 World Organization of the Scout Movement
 WE Charity

Y
 Youth International Conclave
 Young India Foundation
 Young Men's Christian Association
 Young Muslim Advisory Group
 Young Religious Unitarian Universalists
 Young Yatri Organization
 Youth Activism Project
 Youth Liberation of Ann Arbor
 Youth on Board
 Youth Service America
 World YWCA

See also 

List of youth organizations
List of youth topics
Youth-led media

Youth empowerment organizations, list of